Tess Routliffe is a Canadian swimmer. She represented Canada at the 2016 Summer Paralympics in Rio de Janeiro, where she won the silver medal in the women's 200 m individual medley SM7.

Personal life
Her sister Erin is a professional tennis player who represents New Zealand.

References

External links
 
 
 Tess Routliffe at Cœur Handisport

1998 births
Living people
Canadian female backstroke swimmers
Canadian female butterfly swimmers
Canadian female breaststroke swimmers
Canadian female freestyle swimmers
Canadian female medley swimmers
Paralympic swimmers of Canada
Swimmers at the 2016 Summer Paralympics
Medalists at the 2016 Summer Paralympics
Paralympic silver medalists for Canada
S7-classified Paralympic swimmers
Swimmers at the 2018 Commonwealth Games
Medalists at the World Para Swimming Championships
Paralympic medalists in swimming
Commonwealth Games competitors for Canada
Medalists at the 2015 Parapan American Games
Commonwealth Games bronze medallists for Canada
Commonwealth Games medallists in swimming
21st-century Canadian women
Medallists at the 2018 Commonwealth Games